Chhutir Ghonta (  The Last Bell) is a 1980 Bangladeshi drama film written and directed by Azizur Rahman. It stars Abdur Razzak, Shabana, Sujata and Sumon in the lead.

It is based on the true story of a twelve-year-old school boy named Khokon in Bangladesh, who starved to death after the washroom he was in was mistakenly closed by the caretaker the day before the Muslim vacation Eid-ul-Azha started. The boy was found dead after the vacation was over.

Cast

 Abdur Razzak as Abbas Mia the school caretaker
 Sujata as the mother of Khokon
 Sumon saha as Khokon
 Khan Ataur Rahman 
 Shabana as the school maid
 ATM Shamsuzzaman as the school teacher 
 Shawkat Akbar as Khokon's maternal grandfather
 Rabiul Alam 
 Sarbbari

Soundtrack
The film's soundtrack is composed by Shotto Saha.

References

Further reading

External links
 

1980 films
1980 drama films
Bengali-language Bangladeshi films
Bangladeshi drama films
Films scored by Satya Saha
1980s Bengali-language films
Films directed by Azizur Rahman (film director)
Bangladeshi films based on actual events